Mohammed Al-Assa (born in 1971) is a well-known Saudi Arabian actor who started his acting career in the late 1990s. He has acted along with Nasir Al-Gasabi and Abdullah Al-Sadhan, he is mostly known for his various roles in the Saudi comedy Aailt Abu Rowaishd and Tash ma Tash.

Life 
Mohammed was born in Riyadh, Saudi Arabia in 1971. After graduating from high school, he worked as flight attendant  in Saudi Arabian Airlines for seven years, then he started his artistic career in late 1990s. Al-assa is married and has a daughter.

Acting works 
Bayat Abo Al-asie
lwaham
Tash ma Tash
Aailt Abu Rowaishd
Alawalmah
Boyot mn thalg
akab
 Asa Ma Sar
 Akwani wa Kwati
 Al-Kadm Al-Garib

References 
From Ryiadh Newspaper

1971 births
People from Riyadh
Living people
Saudi Arabian male television actors
Saudi Arabian Muslims